Michael Inside is a 2017 Irish prison film, written, directed and co-produced by Frank Berry. It was nominated for four Irish Film & Television Awards and won the Best Film prize.

Plot
18-year-old Michael McCrea lives with his grandfather in a Dublin housing estate. Michael's father is in prison and his mother died of an overdose when he was young. Michael aims to put his life on the right path and find work, but he is caught in possession of a bag of drugs belonging to the older brother of a friend, and sentenced to three months imprisonment.

Production
During the film's production, research was undertaken using discussions with offenders who had passed through the Irish Prison Service's Pathways programme. Filming took place in Cork Prison (the old building, closed in 2016) and Dublin and received funding from the Irish Film Board.

Release
Michael Inside premiered at the 2017 Galway Film Fleadh, and also played at the 2017 Cork Film Festival. It went on general release in Ireland on 6 April 2018.

Reception
Michael Inside has received critical acclaim in Ireland. On review aggregator website Rotten Tomatoes, the film holds an approval rating of 100%, based on 14 reviews, and an average rating of 9/10. It earned five-star reviews from Joe.ie and entertainment.ie.

Accolades

References

External links 
 

2017 films
2010s prison films
Irish drama films
Films directed by Frank Berry
Films set in Dublin (city)
Films shot in Dublin (city)
Films shot in the Republic of Ireland
English-language Irish films
2010s English-language films